Open The Northern Gate was a professional wrestling event produced by Dragon Gate USA.

References

External links
DGUSA.tv

Dragon Gate USA shows
2011 in professional wrestling
2011 in Ontario
Events in Ontario
Professional wrestling in Ontario